Home Island may refer to:

 Home Island, one of the Cocos (Keeling) Islands in the Indian Ocean
 Home Island (Newfoundland and Labrador),  an island off the northeastern shore of Newfoundland and Labrador, south of Cape Chidley, Killiniq Island
 Home Island (Palmyra), group of islets on Palmyra Atoll in the Pacific Ocean
Home Island (Iceland), the main island of Vestmannaeyjar

See also
 Home Islands (disambiguation)